Brighton & Hove operates most bus services in the city of Brighton and Hove in southern England. It is a subsidiary of the Go-Ahead Group.

History
Brighton & Hove was established in 1884 as Brighton, Hove and Preston United Omnibus Company. In 1916, Thomas Tilling took over the company and replaced all its remaining horse buses with motor buses. In November 1935 it was formed as the Brighton Hove and District Omnibus Company. In January 1969 it merged with Southdown Motor Services as a subsidiary of the National Bus Company. In January 1985 in preparation for privatisation, Brighton & Hove was separated from Southdown. In May 1987 it was sold in a management buyout. In November 1993 Brighton & Hove was sold to the Go-Ahead Group.

In 1997, the Go-Ahead Group purchased Brighton Transport (1993) Ltd. for £5.76 million. Brighton Transport was the former municipally-owned bus operator in the city which latterly traded as Brighton Blue Bus following a management buyout in 1993. Go-Ahead would merge its operations with those of Brighton & Hove following the completion of the purchase.

Operations and routes

The company's routes cover a large area encompassing the whole of the city, some parts of West and East Sussex and a single route into Kent. There are 40 separately-numbered standard routes. Frequencies range from every 5 minutes to two journeys per day. In addition, there are nine night bus routes and 19 school bus routes. In September 2005, the company took over many routes previously operated partly or entirely by Stagecoach South, the best example being the Coaster services 12 and 13X to Seaford and Eastbourne.

The company operates from three depots: Conway Street, Whitehawk and Lewes Road. Conway Street also serves as the company's headquarters. The company also has four outstations in Newhaven, Eastbourne, Uckfield and Durrington.

Metro services

During 1996/97, five of the most popular routes (1/1A, 5/5A/5B, 7, 25 and 49) were enhanced with new buses and individual route branding. All five routes offer regular services, modern buses and a wide range of connections throughout the centre of Brighton and Hove, reinforced by a colour-coded diagrammatic map  Since 2004, Brighton & Hove have gradually introduced new buses to the Metro routes, the majority being Scania OmniDekkas. In April 2011, Metro 7 was removed from the Metro network and rebranded as Route 7 with brand new Wright Eclipse Gemini bodied Volvo B9TLs operating on the route. The last Metro branded buses in service were the Scania OmniCity double deckers delivered in 2009, mostly operating on Metro 5. The final few examples of Metro branding were removed in October 2013.

The Regency Route

The Regency Route (29) is one of Brighton & Hove's branded routes. It began as route 729 by the nationalised Southdown Motor Services subsidiary of the National Bus Company, of which Brighton & Hove was a part, and the route was part of the NBC's cross-country "Stagecoach" network. It runs from Churchill Square to Tunbridge Wells, originally using specially-branded East Lancs OmniDekkas, which had high-backed Fainsa seats. Route 29 runs half-hourly, with one bus per hour serving Isfield and the other running via Rose Hill between Lewes and Uckfield. Route 28 follows the same route from Brighton to Lewes, with a service every half-hour just to Lewes and an alternate service every half-hour to Ringmer, providing a combined service every 10 minutes between Brighton and Lewes. In 2012 the OmniDekkas were switched out for a fleet of Volvo B9TL Wright Eclipse Gemini 2s which were put into a Dark Cream, Pink and Purple colour scheme.

Competition
Brighton & Hove face limited competition on some of its network of routes. The Big Lemon bus operator, a community interest company founded in 2007 who used to run a route between the University of Sussex and central Brighton, is the largest competitor. It was set up in an effort to make Brighton and Hove's public transport options more sustainable by using biodiesel collected by the company from businesses around the city as well as offering private hire services.

The Big Lemon originally operated an express service numbered 42X which ran from Brighton station to Falmer station using elderly step entranced buses. However the service was dropped in December 2007. A relaunch of the service commenced in early 2008 numbered 42. In 2010 the company started two more services, 43 and 44. However just months after it began route 43 ended due to low passenger numbers. In 2011 The Big Lemon faced competition from Brighton & Hove Buses in that Brighton Buses lowered its fares to match fares charged by The Big Lemon. In January 2012 The Big Lemon stopped running route 42 and continued to run route 44 only, split into two shuttles numbered UB1 and UB2. The Big Lemon subsequently ceased operation of these services, and shuttle UB1 is operated by the University of Brighton.

Other companies which run into the city include fellow Go-Ahead Group operator Metrobus, which operates routes 270 (to/from East Grinstead), 271, 272 and 273 (all to/from Crawley, with the former two also serving RSC Hospital), as well as Stagecoach South which runs route 17 Horsham to Churchill Square and route 700 Portsmouth to Brighton. Compass Travel also operate the routes 37 and 37B which operate from Bristol Estate to Meadowview.

Subsidies
Under the Transport Act 1985 Brighton and Hove City Council has the authority to put out to tender contracts (>5 years) to fill gaps in bus availability that arise due to lack of profitability.
For example, the 81, 81A and 81C buses are subsidised, depending on route, from .03p (based on operations Monday – Saturday services) up to £1.32 (based on Winter Sunday evening services) for each fare bought.
The council is also obliged to subsidise school bus routes. For example, the 91 Cardinal Newman School bus is currently subsidised at £4.10 per single journey.

Brighton & Hove Bus and Coach Company operates the majority of the contracts.

Fares and ticketing
The company operates, to a large extent, a flat fare system – people can travel on almost all of its buses, and to almost everywhere on its network, for fixed prices. The CitySAVER ticket allows people to travel as often as they want for one day anywhere on any combination of buses, with a few exceptions. There are also longer-period season tickets, there are tickets valid also with local rail services and other bus operators, and various concessions for students, people under 16, passengers boarding at Brighton Station and several others .

In late 2011, the company began supporting Go-Ahead's The Key smartcard a bid to curb ticket sharing and speed up boarding times. The new system has yet to prove itself with many older people and foreign students needing direction on how to actually use "the Key". It can also be used to store train tickets.

Brighton & Hove buses also support The Key's keyGo system for pay-as-you-go travel within the PlusBus zones in Brighton, Eastbourne and Lewes. Journeys are charged per touch in, and are capped daily. If a train journey has been made on the same day with keyGo, the system will cap bus transport to the relevant PlusBus cap..

Contactless payments were first made available in November 2018 as a method for payment, and in September 2019, the company piloted the first tap-on, tap-off contactless scheme in the UK alongside its sister company, Metrobus, with aims to improve boarding times and make travelling convenient.

Named buses

Many of the company's buses have the name of a famous person commemorated on the front.

In 1999 the company ran a competition asking local residents to name the 20 new double-decker buses that had just been added to its fleet. The company had started with names such as Brighton Belle, Brighton Rock, Brighton Pier, Brighton & Hove Albion, Hove Actually and Brighton and Hove in Bloom, and then asked local residents for help. It considered the options of naming the buses after landmarks in the town, people from the past, and present day celebrities with local connections.

In April 2004 the company added another 18 buses to its fleet, and continued the practice of naming them. The company's stated rule for choosing the name was: "The nominations must have made a significant contribution to the life of the local area during their lifetime and must have since died." However several living people are in fact featured on the bus fronts.

In September 2005 the company added a further 19 buses to its fleet, naming them after people who had "made great contributions to the city" – and including more female names, after complaints that the system had been too male-dominated up to that point. For a year one of the buses had been named after local historian and journalist Adam Trimingham.

Fleet

As of August 2016 the fleet consists of 326 buses and coaches.
The company mainly uses East Lancs OmniDekkas, Wright Eclipse Gemini 2s, and Wright StreetDecks. In October 2019 the company received 30 Alexander Dennis Enviro400ER hybrid electric buses for use on Route 5, which are geofenced to be used in electric mode within Brighton and Hove's ULEZ (Ultra Low Emission Zone).

In April 2022, the bus company announced that by the end of 2022, all articulated buses ("bendy buses") in its fleet would be withdrawn. The Mercedes-Benz Citaro buses, acquired from Go-Ahead London started on Route 25 in April 2010 and were used on the 25, 25X and N25 routes from Old Steine or Portslade to the University of Brighton and the University of Sussex. The company stated the withdrawal of these buses was due to low passenger usage after the COVID-19 pandemic, high fuel usage, and a lack of spare parts for the buses. The final articulated bus was withdrawn after operating a special service on 7 November, with the buses replaced with refurbished double-decker buses transferred from Go-Ahead London.

Depots

Brighton (Lewes Road)
Brighton (Whitehawk Road)
Hove (Conway Street)
Newhaven (outstation)
Uckfield (outstation)
Durrington (outstation)
Eastbourne (outstation)

Incidents and accidents
All of the listed incidents have involved at least one Brighton & Hove bus.
On 6 July 2015, a double-decker bus crashed into the back of another on North Street, near the Clock Tower. 19 people were treated at nearby hospitals, 13 at the Royal Sussex County Hospital and six at the Princess Royal Hospital in Haywards Heath, 20 miles away.
On 24 February 2018 at about 0:50 a.m., a 15-year-old boy walking down Marine Parade was hit by a bus and died shortly after being taken to hospital.
On 16 August 2019, a 76-year-old man walking at the corner of Edward Street and Upper Rock Gardens was seriously injured in a collision. He died in hospital just over a week later on 24 August.
On 20 April 2021 between 3 and 4 a.m., an out of service double-decker bus crashed into a bridge on Kingston Lane in Southwick. The crash ripped off the roof of the bus, and the driver continued driving despite the crash. He was charged with dangerous driving and failing to stop after an accident.

See also

List of bus operators of the United Kingdom
Trolleybuses in Brighton
Go-Ahead Group

References

External links
Official website

Transport in Brighton and Hove
Bus operators in Brighton and Hove
Transport in East Sussex
Go-Ahead Group companies
British companies established in 1884
Transport companies established in 1884
Bus operators in East Sussex
Bus operators in West Sussex
1884 establishments in England